Senta auf Abwegen is an East German film. It was released in 1959.

Cast
 Günther Simon: Max Matuschek
 Karin Buchali: Franze Flohr
 Ruth Maria Kubitschek: Mathilde
 Wolf Kaise: Dattelmann
 Albert Garbe: Exner
 Walter Jupé: Erwin Kuhlicke
 Werner Lierck: Arthur Kallweit
 Johannes Arpe: Emil Schwennicke
 Rudolf Fleck: Holdegel
 Hans Klering: Wurzel
 Axel Triebel: Max Munk
 Dom de Beern: Tietz
 Jochen Diestelmann: Reinhold
 Hans Sievers: Martin
 Brigitte Stroh: Renate

External links
 

1959 films
East German films
1950s German-language films
1950s German films